The 1987 Individual Speedway Junior European Championship was the eleventh edition of the European motorcycle speedway Under-21 Championships. The event was won by Gary Havelock of England. It was the last Championship limited to European riders.

European final
July 11, 1987
 Zielona Góra, SPAR Arena

References

1987
European Individual U-21
Individual U-21
Speedway competitions in Poland